Sunshine Nan is a surviving 1918 American silent comedy-drama film starring Ann Pennington and directed by Charles Giblyn. It is based on the novel Calvary Alley by Alice Hegan Rice. It was produced by Famous Players-Lasky and distributed by Paramount Pictures.

Plot
As described in a film magazine, Nance Molloy (Pennington) and Dan Lewis (Hines), children of the slums, are sweethearts. They become mixed up in the death of a neighbor and are sent to reform school. Upon their release they are employed at the Clark Shoe Factory. MacPherson Clark (Barthelmess), son of the owner of the factory, endeavors to steal the formula of a dye developed by Dan, but Nan frustrates his efforts. The patent for the dye brings wealth to Nan and Dan and they are wed.

Cast
Ann Pennington as Nance Molloy
Richard Barthelmess as MacPherson Clark
Johnny Hines as Dan Lewis (credited as John Hines)
Helen Tracy as Mrs. Snawdor
Charles Eldridge as Mr. Snawdor
James A. Furey (credited as J.A. Furey)
Mrs. Lewis McCord
Frank Losee

References

External links

Rice, Alice Caldwell Hegan (1917), Calvary Alley, New York: The Century Co., on the Internet Archive
 promotional poster
promotional

1918 films
American silent feature films
Films directed by Charles Giblyn
1918 comedy-drama films
1910s English-language films
American black-and-white films
Films based on works by Alice Hegan Rice
1910s American films
Silent American comedy-drama films